The Hata Cabinet governed Japan for two months from April 28 to June 30, 1994, under the leadership of Tsutomu Hata of the Japan Renewal Party.

Political background
Hata became Prime Minister following the resignation of Morihiro Hosokawa as head of the coalition government that had come to power following the 1993 general election. In the aftermath of the resignation, the Japan Socialist Party supported Hata's candidacy but left the coalition due to differences over defense policy with the more conservative JRP, reducing the government to minority status in the House of Representatives. This led to the fall of the government in June, when the Socialists formed a coalition deal with their traditional rivals, the Liberal Democratic Party and Hata resigned in favor of Tomiichi Murayama rather than face a confidence vote and force new elections. The Hata cabinet had the shortest tenure of any in postwar Japanese history at 63 days in office, two days less than the Ishibashi cabinet. The parties that made up the coalition would later merge to form the New Frontier Party in December 1994.

Election of the Prime Minister

Ministers 

R = Member of the House of Representatives
C = Member of the House of Councillors

Changes 

 May 8 - Justice Minister Shigeto Nagano resigned after claiming that the Nanjing Massacre had not occurred and was replaced with Hiroshi Nakai.

See also 
 Non-LDP and non-JCP Coalition

References

External links 
 List of Ministers at the Kantei: Hata Cabinet 

Cabinet of Japan
1994 establishments in Japan
1994 disestablishments in Japan
Cabinets established in 1994
Cabinets disestablished in 1994